Stupino Machine-Building Plant is a company based in Stupino, Russia. It is currently part of the Russian Helicopters holding.

The Stupino Machine-Building Production Enterprise produces aircraft propellers and turbine blades.

References

External links
 Official website

Manufacturing companies of Russia
Companies based in Moscow Oblast
Russian Helicopters
Ministry of the Aviation Industry (Soviet Union)
Aircraft component manufacturers of the Soviet Union
Aircraft propeller manufacturers